Central Kurram Tehsil is a subdivision located in Kurram District, Khyber Pakhtunkhwa, Pakistan. The population is 229,356 according to the 2017 census.

History 
Central Kurram was previously known as F.R. Kurram until it was renamed in 2004.

Demographics 

Unlike Upper and Lower Kurram, Central Kurram is mostly inhabited by Sunni Pashtun tribes.

See also 
 List of tehsils of Khyber Pakhtunkhwa

References 

Tehsils of Khyber Pakhtunkhwa
Populated places in Kurram District